Vidya Niketan or Vidyaniketan school may refer to:
 Vidya Niketan School, Chhindwara
 PMC Vidya Niketan School, a group of schools in Pune run by the Pune Municipal Corporation (PMC)
 Vidya Niketan School (Pune), run by the Tata Motors Employees Education Trust